Cornac may refer to:

 a person who drives an elephant, see mahout
 Cornac, a commune of the Lot département in France